No Way Home may refer to:

Film 
 No Way Home (1996 film), a 1996 American crime drama film
 Spider-Man: No Way Home, a 2021 American superhero film in the Marvel Cinematic Universe

Music 
 "No Way Home", 2001 song by Richard Hawley on the album Late Night Final
 "No Way Home", 2009 song by Richard Durand
 "No Way Home", 2010 song by Authority Zero on the album Stories of Survival
 "No Way Home", 2014 debut single by Boaz van de Beatz

Other uses 
 NYX: No Way Home, a 2008–2009 comics miniseries in the NYX series
 "No Way Home", a 1975 episode of the television series Medical Center
 No Way Home, a 2020 video game developed by SMG Studio